{The list of ship launches in 1881 includes a chronological list of ships launched in 1881.



References

Sources

1881
 
1881 in transport